Xhon Marinaj (born 12 October 1997) is an Albanian professional footballer who most recently plays as a midfielder for Albanian club Veleçiku Koplik.

Club career

Early career
Marinaj started his youth career at FK Dinamo Tirana in September 2011. He participated for the first time with the first team on 16 September 2015 in the 2015–16 Albanian Cup match against Bylis Ballsh where he was an unused substitute for the entire game.

Tërbuni Pukë
He made it his first professional debut on 19 March 2016 against Laçi coming on as a substitute in the 74th minute in place of Ivan Jovanović.

International career
Marinaj was called up to the Albania national under-19 football team by coach Arjan Bellaj for a 7 days gathering in Durrës, Albania from 29 August to 5 September 2015.

Career statistics

Club

References

External links

Xhon Marinaj profile FSHF.org

1997 births
Living people
People from Lezhë
Albanian footballers
Albania youth international footballers
Association football midfielders
KF Tërbuni Pukë players
KF Korabi Peshkopi players
KS Veleçiku Koplik players
Kategoria Superiore players